All Time Greatest Hits may refer to:
Bobby Vinton's All-Time Greatest Hits, 1972
20 All-Time Greatest Hits!, a 1991 James Brown compilation album
All-Time Greatest Hits (Roy Orbison album), 1977
All-Time Greatest Hits (Glen Campbell album), 1993
All-Time Greatest Hits (Barry White album), 1994
All Time Greatest Hits (Lynyrd Skynyrd album), 2000
All-Time Greatest Hits (Ray Stevens album), 2001
All Time Greatest Hits (Loretta Lynn album), 2002
All Time Greatest Hits (Brenda K. Starr album), 2002
All-Time Greatest Hits (Wynonna Judd album), 2018
Instant Karma: All-Time Greatest Hits, a 2002 John Lennon compilation album